Maryam Jafari Azarmani (born 25 November 1977) is an Iranian poet, literary critic, and  translator.

Biography 
Azarmani began writing poetry in 1996. She has published several  books of poetry since 2007. She graduated from Alzahra University with a master's degree in Persian literature, the title of her thesis is "Analysis of the implications in one hundred poems of Hossein Monzavi based on Grice's theories". Azarmani has studied French Translation (Bachelor's degree) and translated French poetry.

Books
 Symphony of the locked narrative (سمفونیِ روایتِ قفل شده)
 Piano (پیانو)
 Seven (هفت)
 The pick (زخمه)
 Qanun (قانون)
 68 seconds remain to the performance of this opera (68 ثانیه به اجرای این اپرا مانده است)
 A Saw can be Heard (صدای ارّه می آید)
 Tribun (تریبون)
 Negotiation (مذاکرات)
 Circle (دایره)
 Beat (ضربان)
 The Other Meaning (Analysis of the Implications in Poems of Hossein Monzavi Based on Paul Grice's Theories)

See also
 List of Persian poets and authors

References

20th-century Iranian poets
1977 births
Living people
Persian-language poets
Persian-language women poets
Iranian lyricists
Al-Zahra University alumni
Iranian women poets
21st-century Iranian poets